Max Heinrich Hermann Reinhardt Nettlau (30 April 1865 – 23 July 1944) was a German anarchist and historian. Although born in Neuwaldegg (today part of Vienna) and raised in Vienna, he lived there until the anschluss to Nazi Germany in 1938. Max Nettlau retained his Prussian (later German) nationality throughout his life. A student of the Welsh language he spent time in London where he joined the Socialist League and met William Morris. While in London he met anarchists such as Errico Malatesta and Peter Kropotkin whom he remained in contact with for the rest of his life. He also helped to found Freedom Press for whom he wrote for many years.

In the 1890s realising that a generation of socialist and anarchist militants from the mid-19th century was dying and their archives of writings and correspondence being destroyed, he concentrated his effort and a recent modest inheritance from his father on acquiring and rescuing such collections from destruction. He also made many interviews of veteran militants for posterity. He wrote biographies of many famous anarchists, including Mikhail Bakunin, Élisée Reclus, and Errico Malatesta. He also wrote a seven volume history of anarchism.

His extensive collection or archives was sold to the International Institute of Social History in Amsterdam in 1935. He lived continuously in Amsterdam from 1938 where he worked on cataloging the archive for the Institute. He died there suddenly from stomach cancer in 1944, without ever being harassed.

Works 

 Bibliographie de L'Anarchie (1887)
 Republished in 1964 by P.Galeati (Italy) and in 1968 by Burt Franklin (United States), subtitled "Brief History of Anarchism"
 Élisée Reclus, Anarchist und Gelehrter. "Der Syndikalist" (1928)
 La anarquía a través de los tiempos (1933 or 1935)
 Published 1991 in English by Freedom Press as A Short History of Anarchism
 La Première Internationale en Espagne (1868–1888) (1969)

 Edited
 Oeuvres of Mikhail Bakunin, vol. 1 (1895)

Notes

Works cited

Further reading 

 
 
 
  Scan .

External links 
 Nettlau-Archive at the International Institute of Social History
 Max Nettlau, Writings
 Bibliographie de l'anarchie full text  at the Bibliothèque nationale de France

1865 births
1944 deaths
German anarchists
Historians of anarchism
Anarchists without adjectives
Socialist League (UK, 1885) members
German people of Austrian descent
People from Hernals
Deaths from stomach cancer
Historians of the labour movement in Spain
Deaths from cancer in the Netherlands